Banavara  is a town in the south Indian state of Karnataka.

Geography
Banavara is located in the Arsikere taluk of Hassan district in Karnataka. It is located 15 km from Arsikere city. It is known for its clothing stores.

Banavara is a Hobli that has many villages.

Culture 
Villages with historical importance include Manakathuru. which hosts Kalabaireshwara temple and is located 4 km from ಬಾಣಾವರ. Mallapura villages, located 2 km north-easter of Banavara in Hliyar road.

Transport
The National Highways NH 206 and NH 234 pass through Banavara.

Demographics
As of 2001 India census, Banavara had a population of 8,327, including 4,214 males and 4,113 females.

Gallery

Notable people
 B.S. Raja Iyengar, carnatic vocalist.

References

External links
 http://Hassan.nic.in/

Villages in Hassan district